Fresselines is a commune in the Creuse department in the Nouvelle-Aquitaine region in central France.

Geography

Population

Sights
 The church of St.Julien, dating from the twelfth century.
 The two 15th-century châteaux of Puyguillon and Vervix
 Two 15th-century chapels.

Personalities
 Maurice Rollinat (1846–1903), poet, lived here.
 Gustave Geffroy, (1855–1926), writer, lived here.
 Claude Monet, painter, spent much time here.

See also
Communes of the Creuse department

References

Communes of Creuse